Murchadh Bacagh Ó Cobhthaigh, Irish poet, died 1478.

Ó Cobhthaigh was a member of a hereditary bardic family based in what is now County Westmeath.  His obit in the Annals of the Four Masters describe him as an ollamh, a professor of poetry, indicating that his verses were very highly regarded. No examples of his work is known to survive.

See also

 An Clasach Ó Cobhthaigh, died 1415.
 Aedh Ó Cobhthaigh, died 1452.

References

 Ó Cobhthaigh family, pp. 435–436, in Oxford Dictionary of National Biography, volume 41, Norbury-Osbourne, September 2004.

15th-century Irish poets
1478 deaths
People from County Westmeath
Medieval Irish poets
Year of birth unknown
Irish male poets
Irish-language writers